The Canuck letter was a forged letter to the editor of the Manchester Union Leader, published February 24, 1972, two weeks before the New Hampshire primary of the 1972 United States presidential election. It implied that Senator Edmund Muskie, a candidate for the Democratic Party's presidential nomination, held prejudice against Americans of French-Canadian descent. 

The letter was  a successful attempt at sabotage masterminded by Donald Segretti and written by Ken W. Clawson. In a childish scrawl with poor spelling, the author of the Canuck letter claimed to have met Muskie and his staff in Florida, and to have asked Muskie how he could understand the problems of African Americans when his home state of Maine has such a small black population, to which a member of Muskie's staff was said to have responded, "Not blacks, but we have Canucks" (which the letter spells "Cannocks"); the author further claims that Muskie laughed at the remark. While an affectionate term among Canadians today, "Canuck" is a term often considered derogatory when applied to Americans of French-Canadian ancestry in New England; a significant number of New Hampshire voters were of such ancestry.

On October 10, 1972, FBI investigators revealed that the Canuck letter was part of a dirty tricks campaign against Democrats orchestrated by the Committee for the Re-Election of the President (CRP, later derisively nicknamed CREEP).

The letter's immediate effect was to compel the candidate to give a speech in front of the newspaper's offices, subsequently known as "the crying speech". The letter's indirect effect was to contribute to the implosion of Muskie's candidacy.

The crying speech
On the morning of February 26, two Saturdays before the March 7 primary, Muskie delivered a speech in front of the offices of the Union Leader, calling its publisher, William Loeb, a liar and lambasting him for impugning the character of Muskie's wife, Jane. Newspapers reported that Muskie cried openly: David Broder of The Washington Post had it that Muskie "broke down three times in as many minutes"; David Nyhan of The Boston Globe had Muskie "weeping silently". The CBS Evening News showed Muskie's face contorted with emotion. Muskie maintained that if his voice cracked, it cracked from anger; Muskie's antagonist was the same editor who referred to him in the 1968 election as "Moscow Muskie", and called him a flip-flopper. The tears, Muskie claimed, were actually snow melting on his face. Jim Naughton of The New York Times, standing immediately at Muskie's feet, could not confirm that Muskie cried.

Denunciation
Whether true or false, fear of Muskie's alleged unstable emotional condition led some New Hampshire Democrats to defect to George McGovern. Muskie's winning margin, 46% to McGovern's 37%, was smaller than his campaign had predicted. The bounce and second-place finish led the McGovern campaign to boast of its momentum. By the time of the Florida primary, with McGovern clearing other left-leaning candidates from the field, Muskie's campaign was dead.

Washington Post staff writer Marilyn Berger reported that Nixon White House staffer Ken Clawson had bragged to her about authoring the letter. Clawson denied Berger's account. In October 1972, FBI investigators asserted that the Canuck Letter was part of the dirty tricks campaign against Democrats orchestrated by the Committee for the Re-Election of the President. Loeb, the publisher of the Manchester Union Leader, maintained that the letter was not a fabrication, but later admitted to having some doubt, however, after receiving another letter claiming that someone had been paid $1,000 to write the Canuck Letter. The purported author, Paul Morrison of Deerfield Beach, Florida, was never found.

The authorship of the letter is covered at length in the 1974 book All the President's Men by Bob Woodward and Carl Bernstein and its 1976 film adaptation.

References

Further reading
David Broder, "The Story That Still Nags at Me -- Edmund S. Muskie," Washington Monthly. February 1987.
"Nixon's Nightmare: Fighting to be Believed," Time. May 14, 1973.
Theodore H. White, The Making of the President 1972.

Election scandals in the United States
Political controversies in the United States
Political forgery
1972 in American politics
Canada–United States relations
1972 United States presidential election
Anti-Quebec sentiment
Presidency of Richard Nixon
Watergate scandal
1972 documents